Hartsburg is an unincorporated community in Putnam County, in the U.S. state of Ohio.

History
Hartsburg was not officially platted but was a stop on the Nickel Plate Railroad. The Hartsburg post office closed in 1904.

References

Unincorporated communities in Putnam County, Ohio
Unincorporated communities in Ohio